Michael Eleonu Anwuri (born 24 October 1954) was the Commissioner of Power in the Executive Council of Rivers State. He was appointed to the position in 2015 by Governor Ezenwo Nyesom Wike. He died 3 June 2020.

Early life and education
Born in Ndele in Emohua local government area, Anwuri is a 1977 Mathematics and Computer Science graduate. He holds a Master of Business Administration in Finance, as well as a Postgraduate Diploma degree in Computer Science.

Career
He joined the Wike Executive Council as Commissioner of Power in December 2015.

See also
List of people from Rivers State

References

1954 births
Living people
People from Emohua
Commissioners of ministries of Rivers State
First Wike Executive Council